Marita Viktorovna Katusheva (April 19, 1938January 21, 1992) was a Soviet competitive volleyball player and Olympic silver medalist.

References

External links
 

1938 births
1992 deaths
Soviet women's volleyball players
Russian women's volleyball players
Olympic volleyball players of the Soviet Union
Olympic silver medalists for the Soviet Union
Olympic medalists in volleyball
Medalists at the 1964 Summer Olympics
Volleyball players at the 1964 Summer Olympics